Ust-Charky (Uus Çarkı) is a rural locality (a selo), one of three settlements in addition to Batagay, the administrative centre, and Senchatan in Batagay Urban Settlement of Verkhoyansky District in the Sakha Republic, Russia, located  from Batagay, the administrative center of the district and the Urban Settlement centre. Its population as of the 2010 Census was 2, down from 7 recorded during the 2002 Census.

Geography
Ust-Charky is located by the Adycha River, a little downstream from its confluence with the Charky.

References

Notes

Sources
Official website of the Sakha Republic. Registry of the Administrative-Territorial Divisions of the Sakha Republic. Verkhoyansky District. 

Rural localities in Verkhoyansky District